Sangam: Michael Nyman Meets Indian Masters is the 46th album by Michael Nyman.  It is a collaboration (both composition and performance-wise) with musicians from India including U. Shrinivas and the Misra Brothers.  It was released in 2003 and quickly cut out by its U.S. distributor.  It was the last non-soundtrack Michael Nyman album (and next to last album) to be released on any but his own label, MN Records, founded shortly thereafter.  MN Records reissued the album in 2012.

Musicians
U. Shrinivas, mandolin
Rajan Misra, voice
Sajan Misra, voice
Ritesh Misra, voice
Rajnish Misra, voice
Sanju Sahai, tabla

Michael Nyman Band:
Gabrielle Lester, violin
Catherine Thompson, violin
Edward Coxon, violin
Catherine Musker, viola
Richard Cookson, viola
Anthony Hinnigan, cello
Nicholas Cooper, cello
Mary Scully, double bass
Martin Elliott, bass guitar
David Roach, soprano, alto sax
Simon Haram, soprano, alto sax
Andrew Findon, baritone sax, flute, piccolo
Steven Sidwell, trumpet
David Lee, french horn
Nigel Barr, trombone
Michael Nyman, piano

References

External links
"Michael Nyman: Musical passages from India." The Independent.  Thursday, 20 February 2003 

2003 albums
Michael Nyman albums